Caragols a la llauna (or cargols a la llauna, in certain dialects, or "cargolada" in Northern Catalonia) is a delicacy of Catalan cuisine. It is a simple plate for land snails cooked on a grill, or in a llauna (tin pan) in an oven. They are served with aioli or vinagrette. The dish is particularly favored in Terres de Lleida, where it has been promoted since 1980 by the Aplec del Caragol de Lleida, and in the Pyrenees. The same term is also used for a similar dish in Andorra.

References

Catalan cuisine
Andorran cuisine
Snail dishes